Crusty Demons is a 2006 video game based on the freestyle motorcyclist group Crusty Demons.

Development
Fluent Entertainment acquired the Crusty Demons license in November 2004.

Reception

The game holds a 51% rating on Metacritic indicating mixed or average reviews.

GameSpot rated the game a 4.6 of 10, stating "It's easy to appreciate the conceptual twist Crusty Demons puts on traditional extreme motorcross games; it's too bad that the game never really rises above its promising concept."

References

External links

2006 video games
Extreme sports video games
Motorcycle video games
PlayStation 2 games
Video games based on real people
Video games developed in the United States
Xbox games
Deep Silver games
Multiplayer and single-player video games